Grinyovo or Grinevo is the name of several rural localities in Russia:
Grinevo, Arkhangelsk Oblast, a settlement in Tavrengsky Selsoviet of Konoshsky District of Arkhangelsk Oblast
Grinevo, Belgorod Oblast, a selo in Novooskolsky District of Belgorod Oblast
Grinyovo, Bryansk Oblast, a selo in Grinevsky Rural Administrative Okrug of Pogarsky District of Bryansk Oblast
Grinevo, Novgorod Oblast, a village in Poddorskoye Settlement of Poddorsky District of Novgorod Oblast
Grinevo, Pskov Oblast, a village in Sebezhsky District of Pskov Oblast
Grinevo, Smolensk Oblast, a village in Talashkinskoye Rural Settlement of Smolensky District of Smolensk Oblast
Grinevo, Tula Oblast, a village in Dolmatovskaya Rural Administration of Chernsky District of Tula Oblast
Grinevo, Vologda Oblast, a village in Verkhny Selsoviet of Babayevsky District of Vologda Oblast